Newburyport Brewing Company is a brewery in Newburyport, Massachusetts.

History 

Newburyport Brewing Company was founded in 2012 by recently arrived area residents Chris Webb and Bill Fisher along with Brewmaster Mike Robinson. The brewery is housed in an 8,330 square foot facility and are the first brewery in the state to just can and keg their beers. Statewide distribution began in March 2013 by the Massachusetts Beverage Alliance, whose network consists of Atlas Distributing Inc., Burke Distributing, Colonial Wholesale Beverage, Commercial Distributing Company and Merrimack Valley Distributing Company. In March 2014 the brewery was noted as being among the country's fastest growing breweries with over 5000 barrels produced. In May 2014 the brewery invested in new equipment to increase production to 15,000 barrels.

Products 

Three beer styles in cans are offered: Newburyport Pale Ale ("The Flagship"), Green Head IPA ("The Beer That Bites You Back"), Plum Island Belgian White ("Belgian Style Ale"), Melt Away Session IPA ("Serve Cold. Melt Away"), and the newest offering, Das Kölsch ("Here's To Discovery"). Other styles such as Joppa Stout and limited editions such as Yankee Red are available on draught at the brewery's tap room and at bars throughout Massachusetts and New Hampshire.

The Brewery 

Newburyport Brewing Company hosts live music on Thursday, Friday and Saturday nights in its taproom.  The brewery's founders play in a seven-piece funk band in Newburyport named Das Pintos.

The brewery has recently started hosting artist installations for several weeks at a time. Recent exhibitions include Shane Taylor and Charley Saint Lewis.

Staff 
Brewmaster Mike Robinson's accolades include:

19-time medalist at the Masters Championship of Amateur Brewing | 2009 Sam Adams Longshot winner – chosen over 1,300 entrants | 2008 Sam Adams Longshot finalist | 3-time Sam Adams Patriot finalist | New England Home Brewer of the Year | 2015 United States Beer Tasting Competition Gold medals for Plum Island White, Kolsch, and Yankee Red Ale  | 2015 Great International Beer & Cider Competition Gold medal for 1635 American Barley Wine.

See also
 List of microbreweries

References

External links
 

Beer brewing companies based in Massachusetts
Companies based in Newburyport, Massachusetts
Food and drink companies established in 2012
2012 establishments in Massachusetts